Tiki Boyd's was a tiki bar in Denver, Colorado in operation from 2005 to 2006. Experimental sound/noise musician Boyd Rice designed the bar, revamping the bar originally known as the East Coast Bar located in the Ramada Denver Downtown.  A tiki enthusiast, Rice provided art from his personal collection for the bar. Rice is also a tiki scholar, having written an essay for Martin McIntosh's book, Taboo: The Art of Tiki. Lorin Partridge, a friend of Rice, tended the bar, and the bar was known for a drink called a Bronze Serpent. The music was played exclusively from vinyl including records by Martin Denny and Arthur Lyman, also from Rice's collection.

Location

Historically, site of the Ramada in which Tiki Boyd's was located used to be the Heart o' Denver Motor Hotel (1960-1975), which featured a bar called the Tiki Bar. Eli Hedley, the man who popularized the beachcomber aesthetic, designed the tiki lounge at the motor hotel. The site is also historically noteworthy for being located on Colfax Avenue, the longest commercial street in the United States of America.

Closure
Tiki Boyd's changed names, themes, and management in early 2006, when Boyd Rice withdrew his support, decorations, and music collection from the bar.

References 

Buildings and structures in Denver
History of Denver
Tiki bars
Drinking establishments in Colorado
2005 establishments in Colorado
2006 disestablishments in Colorado